Kotamreddy Sridhar Reddy is an Indian politician from Nellore, Andhra Pradesh. He is a Member of Legislative Assembly of the Indian state of Andhra Pradesh.

Personal life
He was married to Sujitha and they have two daughters Lakshmi Haindhavi and Sai Vaishnavi who are married to Balanandha Reddy and Nanin respectively. Kotamreddy Sridhar Reddy's profession is contractor and his spouse is a designer.

Political career
Kotamreddy Sridhar Reddy had participated in college elections when he was pursuing his degree in V.R. College, Nellore in the year 1987. 
 In 1977 he started his career as a student leader when he was in Secondary education.
 In 1981 he became a student leader in V.R. College. 
 In 1983 he had participated in ASSAM TRUTH FORCE (SATHYAGRAHAM).
 In 1985 when he was in degree final year, Kotamreddy Sridhar Reddy became the president of V.R. College. When he was working as a president of college he had participated in AMARANA NIRAHARA DEKSHA for 13 days against the college management as a member of Akhila Bharatha Vidyarthi Parishath (ABVP).
 He also worked as a city secretary when he was in degree 1st year 
 In 1986 he became S.V. University Sanitary Member.
 In 1987 he became District Youth General Secretary.
 In 1989 he became State Youth General Secretary.
 During the period of 1987 to 2014 he had participated in hundreds of movements and protests.
 In 2014 for the first time he was elected as Nellore Rural Member of Legislative Assembly.
 In 2023 he quit YSRCP alleging that his phone was tapped by his own party.

References

External links 
https://www.greatandhra.com/politics/gossip/hats-off-to-sridhar-reddy-58964.html

Living people
YSR Congress Party
Andhra Pradesh politicians
Andhra Pradesh MLAs 2014–2019
Andhra Pradesh MLAs 2019–2024
1966 births